The Army Goodwill Schools is a system of schools in Jammu and Kashmir and Ladakh in India, which is run by Indian Army. There are 45 schools established by the Indian Army, as a part of goodwill initiative in Jammu and Kashmir.

Currently, the Northern Command of the Indian Army is running 45 Army Goodwill Schools in Jammu and Kashmir, providing education to nearly 15,000 students. Army Goodwill Schools play an important role in providing quality education to the population affected by terrorism in Jammu and Kashmir.

History 
Army Goodwill Schools were started with four primary schools in 1998. Currently, the Indian Army runs 45 Army Goodwill Schools. It is run by the 25 Division of the Indian Army.
The Schools recorded 100% pass result in the Central Board of Secondary Education (CBSE) Class 10 exams in the year 2019.

Schools in North Kashmir 

Following is the List of Schools in Noth Kashmir region

Army Goodwill School, Budkot 
Army Goodwill School Budkot meet the essential requirement of Primary and Secondary education in Handwara Region. The school is following syllabus of Jammu and Kashmir Board Of Secondary Education and run on ‘no profit and no loss Basis’ and funded primarily under Operation Sadhbhavna.

The school provide quality education to children of rural areas of Rajwar Area. The school was established at Budkot (near Handwara) in April 2004 under Operation Sadhbhavna. The aim of the school is to provide quality Primary and Secondary education to the youth in the area. The curriculum of the school is designed to achieve the overall personality development of a child. The school strives to provide its students adequate exposure to the culture & tradition of the country through various co-curricular activities. In the year 2017 the school was upgraded to 10th standard. Presently the school caters for 470 students (285 boys &185 girls).

On 24 Jun 2021, the school was re-christened as Ashutosh Army Goodwill School, Budkot in memory of Late Colonel Ashutosh Sharma, SM**. Mr. Khalid Jalal is the Principal of the School.

Army Goodwill School, Aragam 
Army Goodwill School, Aragam was established on 01 Apr 2005 under 'Operation-Sadbhavana'. It is jointly developed by Army and Aragam Panchayat.

The school follows the curriculum of the State Board of Secondary Education (BOSE) with its syllabus structured on NCERT books, which provides a comprehensive yet simple mode of learning to students. The school is being run up to VIII standard. The school today boasts strength of 187 students and 15 staff members drawn from Bandipora Tehsil. The school promotes the concept of "Learn with Fun" with modern training aids and attempts to develop the overall personality of students.

Students who receive education in Army Goodwill School Aragam belong to various social groups. It also facilitates the students in various co-curricular activities wherein various students are taking part in all the activities at various district, division and National levels.

Army Goodwill School, Hajin 
Army Goodwill School, Hajin was Established on 24 Aug 2005. It was planned and constructed under 'Operation Sadhbhavana' of the Army. The school is located on the banks of Jhelum and is seven kilometers from the township of Sumbul at an altitude of 4800 feet. The then Member of Legislative Assembly, Mohd Yousuf Parray (alias Kukka Parray) was also instrumental in supporting the school in the initial stages. 

At the formative stage, the school was raised up to V Standard. Today the school has grown to a middle school till X Standard and has strength of 492 students and 26 staff members. It follows the State Board of Secondary Education (BOSE) with its syllabus structured on NCERT books, which provides a comprehensive yet simple mode of learning to students. The school attempts to develop the overall personality of a student through interactive learning programme.

Army Goodwill School, Hajin facilitate the cultivation of a healthy thought process and enhanced the cognitive abilities of the children to help them to become caring citizen of the country. Army Goodwill School, Hajin also facilitates the students in various co-curricular activities wherein students take part in all the activities at various district, and National levels.

Army Goodwill School, Bandipora 
Army Goodwill School, Bandipora was established at Kharpora in 2004 under 'Operation Sadhbhavana'. The school imparted education till First standard and had seven students on its rolls. However, this humble beginning saw exponential progress over the years due to the passion and dedication of the school staff.

Consequently, the reputation of the school enhanced manifold and it became highly oversubscribed as numerous locals expressed a desire for admission of their children. The school shifted to its present location at Aitmul in the year 2014 and has been functioning from there ever since.

By 2015, the school had expanded till X Standard with more than 400 students and was recognized by J&K Education Board i.e State Board of Secondary Education (BOSE) . The school has been imparting education on modern & scientific lines and occupies a premier space in the hearts & minds of the local population. It provides an opportunity to the children of Bandipora to reach their full potential and realize their dreams in the field of not only quality education but also on other fields like sports, arts, NCC(National Cadets Corps), Scouts, public speaking and etc.

Other details 
A Goodwill School was renamed as 'Shaheed Lance Naik Nazir Ahmad Wani, Ashok Chakra, Sena Medal, Army Goodwill School' after Nazir Ahmad Wani in June 2019.

In May 2019, Hizbul Mujahideen, a militant organisation  threatens Kashmiri parents to not send children to Army Goodwill Schools.

See also 
 Kendriya Vidyalaya
 Jawahar Navodaya Vidyalaya
 Indian Army Public Schools

References

External links 
 Official website

School types
Educational institutions established in 1998
1998 establishments in Jammu and Kashmir
Education policy in India